Tomáš Křivánek (born January 10, 1966) is a Czechoslovak-Czech sprint canoeist who competed from the late 1980s to the late 1990s. He won five medals at the ICF Canoe Sprint World Championships with a gold (C-4 200 m: 1998), a silver (C-4 200 m: 1995) and three bronzes (C-4 200 m: 1994, 1997; C-4 500 m: 1993).

Křivánek also competed in the C-2 1000 m event at the 1988 Summer Olympics in Seoul, but was eliminated in the semifinal round.

References

Sports-reference.com profile

1966 births
Canoeists at the 1988 Summer Olympics
Czech male canoeists
Czechoslovak male canoeists
Living people
Olympic canoeists of Czechoslovakia
ICF Canoe Sprint World Championships medalists in Canadian